The Beaux-Arts Institute of Design (BAID, later the National Institute for Architectural Education) was an art and architectural school at 304 East 44th Street in Turtle Bay, Manhattan, in New York City. It was founded in 1916 by Lloyd Warren for the training of American architects, sculptors and mural painters consistent with the educational agenda of the French École des Beaux-Arts.

Origins 

BAID grew out of the Society of Beaux-Arts Architects, a formal club of American architects who had attended the Parisian school.

From its beginning in 1894, the Society of Beaux-Arts Architects had been interested in improving architectural education in the U.S..  It took on the task of developing standard architectural "programmes" for design problems to be given as assignments in architecture schools and in independent ateliers.  The intent was to raise performance standards, but the effect also was to standardize the way architecture was taught all across the United States.  By 1900, most American architecture schools and many independent ateliers were participating.  By 1916 the burden of providing problem statements and jurying the work from an increasing number of schools and ateliers exceeded the capacity of the Society, so it established BAID to carry on this work.

Among sculpture professionals, the foundation of BAID ensured a supply of competent decorative sculptors, and allowed the members of the National Sculpture Society to position themselves as fine artists in comparison.

History 
The National Sculpture Society deeded over a building at 126 East 75th Street to the newly created BAID.  Courses began on September 18, 1916 in three departments. The architecture department was associated with a committee from the Society; the sculpture department with a committee from the National Sculpture Society; and the mural department with a committee from the Society of Mural Painters.

Architect Frederic Charles Hirons of Dennison & Hirons was central to the founding and running of the school.  Hirons had attended the Paris school from 1904 through 1909; co-founded BAID in 1916; designed the BAID building in 1928 (won through a competition, in the manner of Beaux-Arts); and served as president of the Society of Beaux-Arts Architects from 1937 through 1939.

Another founder was Lloyd Warren, the brother of Whitney Warren of Warren and Wetmore. He was instrumental in getting top figures from the sculptural and architectural fields to teach at BAID, and serve on competition panels, for the sake of the profession.

In 1927 the first winner of the annual Whitney Warren architectural competition was Carl Conrad Franz Kressbach, a student at the Graduate School of Architecture at Harvard University (graduate of University of Michigan).  His design "An airport for a large city" drew interest among persons concerned with the future of commercial aviation, it depicted a scheme for dispatching and receiving commercial planes.

In 1956 the Institute changed its name to the National Institute for Architectural Education, reflecting a change of focus away from European traditions.  In 1995 it was again renamed the Van Alen Institute.

Activities 

BAID architectural competitions were published across the country, administered through university architecture schools or independent studios, and the entries all graded by jury at once.  The highest number of entries received was in the 1929–1930 year, when 9500 entries came into New York City for judging.

BAID also had on-site instruction and classrooms, with large sculpture studios open long hours and into the evenings for the convenience of working students and part-time teachers.

The school tended to be populated by students who were either immigrants or first-generation Americans.  They often came from working-class backgrounds, and their training was towards getting a union job in the building trades, rather than becoming a fine arts sculptor.  Many of these students also attended the Art Students League of New York.

Notable alumni 
 Edmond Romulus Amateis, sculptor, entered BAID in 1915 
 Beniamino Benvenuto Bufano
 Gaetano Cecere, sculptor
 Rose Connor, architect in Pasadena, California
 Herbert Ferber, sculptor, attended circa 1926
 Mitchell Fields, sculptor, attended BAID from 1917–1927
 Harold H. Fisher, church architect
 Paul Fjelde, sculptor, professor at Pratt Institute
 Vincent Glinsky, sculptor; student (1916-1920) and instructor (1931–32; 1940–41)
 Chaim Gross, sculptor, attended circa 1922
 Stratton Hammon, Colonial Revival domestic architect, Louisville, Kentucky
 Milton Hebald, sculptor
 Henry Hensche, painter
 Oswald Hoepfner, student and instructor c. 1920-1926
 Herbert B. Hunter, architect.
 Joseph Kiselewski, sculptor
 Ibram Lassaw, sculptor, attended circa 1928
 Ellamae Ellis League, architect from Macon, Georgia, first woman FAIA from Georgia
 John Gaw Meem, architect, Atelier Denver
 Arthur C. Morgan, sculptor of mostly Louisiana political and business figures
 Jules Olitski, painter, attended BAID from 1940–42
 Corrado Parducci, sculptor
 David K. Rubins, sculptor
 Louis Slobodkin, sculptor and children's book author
 Cesare Stea, sculptor
 Albert Stewart, sculptor
 Robert Edward Weaver, muralist, painter, sculptor, BAID medalist 1935-1936 for mural design
 Albert W. Wein, sculptor, attended 1932
 Paul R. Williams, architect, Atelier near Los Angeles<ref>"Williams the Conqueror . Trojan Family Magazine, University of Southern California. Spring 2004. Retrieved on January 27, 2009.</ref>

See also
 National Register of Historic Places listings in Manhattan from 14th to 59th Streets
 List of New York City Designated Landmarks in Manhattan from 14th to 59th Streets

References

Further reading

 Bogart, Michele H., Public Sculpture and the Civic Ideal in New York City: 1890-1930, University of Chicago Press, Chicago, 1989
 Brummé, C. Ludwig, Contemporary American Sculpture, Crown Publishers, New York, 1948
 Gurney, George, Sculpture and the Federal Triangle, Smithsonian Institution Press, Washington, D.C.,  1985
 Harbeson, John F. The Study of Architectural Design: With Special Reference to the Program of the Beaux-Arts Institute of Design, Pencil Points Press Inc., New York, 1926
 Kvaran, Einar Einarsson, Architectural Sculpture in America'', unpublished manuscript

External links
 Edgar A. Josselyn papers, circa 1889. Held by the Department of Drawings & Archives, Avery Architectural & Fine Arts Library, Columbia University.

1916 establishments in New York City
Art schools in New York City
New York City Designated Landmarks in Manhattan
Educational institutions established in 1916
Turtle Bay, Manhattan